Bufo aspinius is a species of toad in the family Bufonidae, described in 1996.
It is endemic to China specifically Yangbi Yi Autonomous County, west of Yunling Mountains in Yunnan Province and occurs at 1800 to 2200 meters elevation.
Its natural habitats are subtropical or tropical moist montane forests, rivers, swamps, and arable land.
This species is threatened by habitat loss for smallholder farming and it only occurs in one known protected area Tongbiguan Nature Reserve.

References 

aspinius
Amphibians described in 1996
Taxonomy articles created by Polbot